The Viswema Hall is a multi-purpose arena currently under construction in Swe–ba ward, Viswema, Nagaland. Construction began in 2020 and upon completion it will be the first of its kind in the state. The arena will host various sporting events, music concerts, meetings, etc.

Hall
The multi-purpose hall once constructed will have a stage area of 200 sq ft and will accommodate over 3200 persons during sport events and about 5000 persons during social and cultural events. It will also serve as a local community center.

References

Viswema
Buildings and structures in Nagaland